Ficarra is a comune (municipality) in the Metropolitan City of Messina in the Italian region Sicily, located about  east of Palermo and about  west of Messina, in the Monti Nebrodi. It is surrounded by woods of hazel and olive trees.

History
Ficarra is believed to be Mediaeval in origin, possibly during the Muslim Emirate of Sicily. The name may be derived from the Arabic Fakhar (meaning: glorious), or the Sicilian Ficara (meaning: a field of figs).

Main sights

Convent of the Minor Friars of St. Francis, dating to 1522
Sanctuary of the Annunziata (15th century)
Jail Fortress, originating as a watch tower and later turned into an austere stone fortress with square plan. It was damaged by bombs during World War II.

Notable people
Giacinto Artale (1906–1970)
Daniel Ricciardo - paternal family hails from the comune.

Twin towns
 Vigevano, Italy

References

External links
 Official website

Cities and towns in Sicily